A lycanthrope or werewolf is a mythological creature.

Lycanthrope may also refer to:

 "Lycanthrope" (song), a song by +44 from When Your Heart Stops Beating
 Lycanthropes, a role-playing accessory book by Geoff Pass for Chill

See also
Lycanthropy (disambiguation)
 Lycan (disambiguation)
 Lycanthropus, a 1962 Italian horror film
 Licántropo, a 1996 Spanish horror film